Miles Krajewski (born 27 June 2005) is an American para-badminton player who competes in international elite events. He is a World Championship silver medalist in the men's doubles and a Parapan American Games silver medalist in the men's singles. Along with two gold medals from the 2016 Pan Am Championship and 2018 silver medalist in singles and gold medalist in doubles. He recently won silver in doubles at the World Championships in Tokyo and recently won gold in singles at the PanAms in Colombia two weeks after World Championships.

Achievements

World Championships 
Men’s doubles

Parapan American Games 
Men's singles

Pan Am Championships 
Men's singles

Men's doubles

Doubles

Mixed doubles

International Tournaments (3 titles, 3 runners-up) 
Men's doubles

Doubles

Mixed doubles

References

Notes 

2005 births
Living people
Sportspeople from Lincoln, Nebraska
People from Yankton, South Dakota
American male badminton players
American para-badminton players
Medalists at the 2019 Parapan American Games
Sportspeople from South Dakota